Sultan Glacier is a glacier flowing south-west into Table Bay, Elephant Island, in the South Shetland Islands of Antarctica. It was named by the United Kingdom Antarctic Place-Names Committee (UK-APC) after HMS Sultan, a shore-based Royal Navy engineering school which provided the refuge hut for the UK Joint Services Expedition to Elephant Island, 1970-71.

See also
 List of glaciers in the Antarctic
 Glaciology

References

Glaciers of Elephant Island
Elephant Island